Shorea hypochra called, along with some other species in the genus Shorea, white meranti, is a species of tree in the family Dipterocarpaceae. It grows naturally in Cambodia, Sumatra, Laos, Peninsular Malaysia, Thailand, and Vietnam.

Description
A very large tree up to 60 m tall with bole branchless for 24–30 m and up to 165 cm in diameter; leaves ovate to elliptical, 7–18 cm x 4.5–8 cm, thickly leathery, with 15-20 pairs of secondary veins, lower surface cream lepidote, petiole 2–4 cm long; stamens 15, stylopidium absent; larger fruit calyx lobes up to 17 cm x 2.6 cm. S. hypochra occurs on flat and undulating land near the coast or in seasonal dipterocarp forest at low latitude. The density of the wood is 530–865 kg/mᶟ at 15% moisture content.

Distribution
Indo-China towards Peninsular Malaysia and the Riau and Lingga Archipelago.

Uses
The timber is used as white meranti. A dammar of good quality ('dammar temak') has been yielded on a commercial scale.

References

[PROSEA] Plant Resource of South-East Asia 5. 1994a. (1)Timber Trees: Major commercial timbers. PROSEA, Bogor.

hypochra
Trees of Indo-China
Trees of Peninsular Malaysia
Trees of Sumatra
Taxonomy articles created by Polbot